Malden is a city in Middlesex County, Massachusetts, United States. At the time of the 2020 U.S. Census, the population was 66,263 people.

History

Malden, a hilly woodland area north of the Mystic River, was settled by Puritans in 1640 on land purchased in 1629 from the Pennacook tribe and a further grant in 1639 by the Squaw Sachem of Mistick and her husband, Webcowet. The area was originally called the "Mistick Side" and was a part of Charlestown. It was incorporated as a separate town in 1649 under the name "Mauldon". The name Malden was selected by Joseph Hills, an early settler and landholder, and was named after Maldon, England. The city originally included what are now the adjacent cities of Melrose (until 1850) and Everett (until 1870).

At the time of the American Revolution, the population was at about 1,000 people, and the citizens were involved early in resisting British rule: they boycotted the consumption of tea in 1770 to protest the Revenue Act of 1766, and it was also the first town to petition the colonial government to secede from the British Empire.

Malden High School has the second-oldest continuous high school football rivalry in the United States with Medford High School.  The first "Thanksgiving Day Game" dates back to 1889.

In the mid-1980s, Malden came to national renown as the location of the controversial Fells Acres day care sexual abuse trial.

In 2004, a same-sex Malden couple was the first to marry in Massachusetts (and, thus, in the United States) at 9:15 am on May 17, 2004 at Cambridge City Hall.  Massachusetts was the first state in the United States to issue same-sex marriage licenses.

Geography

Malden is bordered by Melrose on the north, Medford on the west, Everett on the south, Revere on the east, and Saugus on the northeast. Boojum Rock located in the north west corner of Malden inside the Middlesex Fells Reservation is the  highest point in Malden with an elevation of approximately 275 feet.

Bordered on the northwest by the cliffs of Middlesex Fells, Malden is drained by the Malden River.

Demographics

As of the 2010 United States Census, there were 59,450 people, 25,161 households, and 13,575 families residing in the city. The racial makeup of the city was 52.5% White, 14.8% African American, 0.1% Native American, 20.1% Asian (11.1% Chinese, 3.1% Asian Indian, 2.8% Vietnamese), 0.1% Pacific Islander, 2.1% from other races, and 3.5% were multiracial. 8.6% of the population were Hispanic or Latino of any race (1.8% Puerto Rican, 1.7% Brazilian, 1.5% Salvadoran, 0.9% Colombian, 0.7% Dominican, 0.5% Mexican, 0.4% Peruvian, 0.4% Guatemalan).

There were 23,009 households, out of which 25.4% had children under the age of 18 living with them, 42.8% were married couples living together, 12.3% had a female householder with no husband present, and 41.0% were non-families. Of all households 32.2% were made up of individuals, and 11.5% had someone living alone who was 65 years of age or older. The average household size was 2.42 and the average family size was 3.13.

In the city, the population was spread out, with 19.9% under the age of 18, 8.5% from 18 to 24, 36.9% from 25 to 44, 20.8% from 45 to 64, and 13.9% who were 65 years of age or older. The median age was 36 years. For every 100 females, there were 92.8 males. For every 100 females age 18 and over, there were 90.0 males.

The median income for a household in the city was $45,654, and the median income for a family was $55,557. Males had a median income of $37,741 versus $31,157 for females. The per capita income for the city was $22,004. About 6.6% of families and 9.2% of the population were below the poverty line, including 11.6% of those under age 18 and 10.2% of those age 65 or over.

Immigrants
As of 2009 and 2010, 37% of residents of Malden were born outside of the United States. This is twice the number in 1990, and an increase from the 26% of foreign-born residents in 2000. Malden's percentage of foreign-born residents was the second-highest in Massachusetts, after Chelsea.

As of 2009 and 2010 immigrants originate from Brazil, China, Haiti, India, Morocco, and Pakistan. The Moroccan American Civic and Cultural Association is located in Malden.

Previous immigrants included Italians and Irish in the late 1800s and early 1900s. Malden also received Jews who arrived escaping Europe before and after World War II.

Asian population

In 1990 Malden had 2,805 Asian residents, making the city 5.2% Asian. In 2000 this increased to 7,882 Asians, or 14.5% of the city's population, making it one of ten Massachusetts cities with the largest Asian populations in the state. There were 4,504 ethnic Chinese people (57% of Malden's Asians), 876 ethnic Vietnamese, and 696 ethnic Indians. From 1990 to 2000 the Vietnamese population increased by 187% and the Indian population increased by 262%.

From 2000 to 2010 the Chinese population of Malden increased by about 50%.

Institutions serving the Asian community in Malden include the Immigrant Learning Center, which offers English as a second language classes; the Malden Asian Pacific American Coalition; a satellite office of the Vietnamese American Civic Association; the nonprofit multiservice organization Great Wall Center; and the antipoverty agency Tri-City Community Action Program Inc. In the 2017, South Cove Community Health center began building a new site in Malden to serve the growing Asian American population.

Education

Malden Public Schools is the school district. Malden has five public elementary and middle schools; one charter elementary, middle, and high school; one public high school; one Catholic high school, one Catholic Pre-K through 8 school, Cheverus Catholic School; and one public preschool.  The elementary schools in Malden were replaced in the late 1990s with five new facilities: Beebe, Ferryway, Forestdale, Linden, and Salemwood. The city's three high schools are Malden High School, Malden Catholic High School and Mystic Valley Regional Charter High School. According to a study conducted by the National Center for Education Statistics in 2013, Malden High School was found to be the most diverse public high school in Massachusetts.

Neighborhoods

Like many communities in New England, many towns and neighborhoods are organized around squares, which are located at the crossroads and town commons dating back from the colonial times and the early 19th century. Many of the neighborhoods take their name and identity from the main square in their area.

Malden's squares include Malden Square (at Main and Pleasant streets), Converse Square (at Main, Salem, and Ferry streets) Oak Grove Square (at Oak Grove T Station), Bellrock Square (at the intersections of Cross, Main and Medford streets), Judson Square (near Ferryway School), former Suffolk Square (at Cross and Bryant streets), once the location of a thriving Jewish community, Maplewood Square (at Lebanon, Maplewood and Salem streets) and Linden Square.

Some of the neighborhoods in Malden include Faulkner (location of the former Suffolk Square), West End, Edgeworth, Linden, Ferryway, Forestdale, Maplewood, Bellrock, and Belmont Hill (located between Bellrock and Ferryway).

Bellrock

Bellrock is the south central section of the city, bordered by Main Street on the east, Charles Street on the north, the Malden River on the west, and the Everett line on the south.  It contains Bell Rock Memorial Park (listed on the National Register of Historic Places) and Bell Rock Cemetery (also listed), which contains marked graves dating back to 1670. Bell Rock Cemetery was called Sandy Bank until the establishment of the Salem Street Cemetery in 1832; it was then known as the Old Burial Ground for half a century until it was renamed in 1882. Also located in this area are the headquarters for New England Coffee.

Edgeworth
The Edgeworth neighborhood is the southwest section of the city. It contains Devir Park, Pearl St. Park, and Callahan Park. The city's football stadium, Macdonald Stadium is in Edgeworth. A school in Edgeworth is the former Emerson grammar school. The Converse Rubber Factory and offices once operated in Edgeworth at the bottom of Pearl Street. This is the original home of the Converse "All-Star" Basketball Sneakers. Malden Catholic High School was originally located in Edgeworth on Highland Ave. The school's football team played their home games at Brother Gilbert Stadium, located at Commercial & Medford Streets in Edgeworth.  Immaculate Conception Grammar School was located in Edgeworth on the corner of Charles St. and Highland Ave.  Edgeworth touches Everett and Medford.  Edgeworth is also home to St. Rocco's Feast, SunSetter Awnings and Pisa Pizza.

Maplewood
In 1847, Joshua Webster, president of the Saugus Branch Railroad, purchased 200 acres in Malden along its projected route. Here, he planned a residential development with wide streets and ornamental trees. Due to the hundreds of maple trees Webster planted, the neighborhood became known as Maplewood.

Government and infrastructure

Mayor and city council

The city government of Malden includes a mayor and city council. The mayor is elected to a four-year term. As of May 2021, the mayor is Gary Christenson. Christensen was most recently elected to this position on November 5, 2019 and his current four-year term expires at the end of 2023.

The Malden City Council has eleven elected members. Eight of these members are elected from the city's eight wards and are known as Ward Councillors. Three of the members, known as Councillors-at-Large, are elected city-wide. All eleven are elected to two-year terms. The city council elects from among its members an individual to serve as Council President.

Transportation

Major highways
One limited access route, U.S. 1, runs through the city, connecting Boston to the North Shore suburbs. Additionally, Route 28, Route 60 and Route 99 run through Malden as arterial routes. Route 16 and Interstate 93 are a short distance outside the city’s borders.

Bus and rail
The city is served by the Orange Line subway that connects it to downtown Boston. The city's subway stops are Malden Center and Oak Grove. The MBTA's commuter rail also has one stop in the city (Malden Center) and can stop at Oak Grove if necessary. During the first few years of the 2000s, the MBTA updated signal systems and Orange Line service was replaced by shuttle buses at night. Since September 2007, such service interruptions have been limited to occasional weekends, while signal system repairs necessitated closing off the northern portion of the Orange Line and rerouting passengers via replacement bus service from either the Haymarket subway stop or Wellington Station.

There is a sizable section of the old Boston and Maine Saugus Branch Railroad line running across the middle of Malden. This line is currently owned by the MBTA, but has been out of use since 1993 and has not seen passenger service since 1958. The Saugus Branch Railroad has now been converted into a 10-foot wide multi-use trail known as the Northern Strand Trail (aka Bike to the Sea Trail) which opened in December 2012. The paved section of Northern Strand trail currently extends from Wellington Street in Everett through Linden Square at the Malden/Revere. The unpaved section of the trail as of July 2019 runs through Revere and Saugus to Boston Street at the Lynn line. Trail extensions to the Mystic River / Encore Casino in Everett and paving the trail thru Revere, Saugus and to Western Avenue in Lynn will be built starting in Fall 2019. The City of Lynn and the Department of Conservation and Recreation will also be building a separated bicycle lane through Lynn Common, down Market Street and the Lynnway to Lynn and Nahant Beaches. The Malden section of the trail features the "ArtLine" a series of murals and sculptures created through the efforts of Malden Arts. Malden ArtLine

Bus service to all adjacent communities is also available via the service of the MBTA.

Points of interest

Approximately 30 park sites throughout the city provide a variety of recreational facilities including tennis courts, basketball courts, playgrounds, and ballfields. Other sites include a 400-meter synthetic running track at MacDonald Stadium;  of the Middlesex Fells Reservation; the  Fellsmere Pond; a DCR-owned-and-operated swimming pool; a 30,000 square feet (2,800 m2) field house built under the new school rebuilding plan; the state-of-the-art Malden YMCA finished construction in early 2007; and Pine Banks Park, operated by a Board of Trustees with equal representation by the cities of Malden and Melrose. Waitt's Mountain is also in Malden.

Other points of interest include the Converse Memorial Library and the Congregation Beth Israel.  One of Malden's finest and most notable landmarks is the public library which was designed by Henry Hobson Richardson and built in 1885. The initial construction of the library was funded by Malden's first mayor, Elisha S. Converse, who also funded its acquisition of an art collection.

Notable people

 Johnny A., musician
 Mary Hall Barrett Adams, editor
 Jack Albertson, award-winning actor
 E. Florence Barker (1840–1897), first president of the National Woman's Relief Corps 
 The Ames Brothers, singing quartet
 Reginald R. Belknap, military officer
 Ella A. Bigelow (1849–1917), author and clubwoman
 Walter Brennan, award-winning actor
 Philip Bynoe, Three-time Grammy nominee and Emmy Award-winning Musician
 George Loring Brown, painter
 George R. Carey, inventor
 Gary Cherone, singer-songwriter
Larnel Coleman, NFL player
 Elisha S. Converse, first mayor of Malden
 Kevin Cullen, journalist
Albert DeSalvo, The Boston Strangler
 Timothy Dexter, businessman
 Gary DiSarcina, former Major League Baseball player
 Sheperd Doeleman, Astrophysicist and Director of the Event Horizon Telescope
 Ed Emberley, children's author
 Anna Christy Fall (1855–1930), lawyer
 Abbie M. Gannett (1845–1895), essayist, poet and philanthropist
 Erle Stanley Gardner, author, creator of Perry Mason
 Breno Giacomini, National Football League player
 John Gilgun, poet and novelist
 Ralph Goldstein (1913–1997), Olympic épée fencer
 Norman Greenbaum, guitarist, singer-songwriter
 Kyle Hanson, TV Meteorologist, currently with NBC-15 in Mobile, Alabama
 Mary E. Hewitt (1807–1884), poet and editor 
 Willis B. Hunt, Jr., federal judge
 Adoniram Judson, first Protestant missionary in Burma
 Martin Theodore Kearney, California agriculturist
 Toni Kelner, mystery and urban fantasy writer and editor
 Keith Knight, cartoonist
 Killer Kowalski, former professional wrestler
 Ellis F. Lawrence, architect
 Fred A. Leuchter, execution technician and Holocaust denial author
 Torbert MacDonald, U.S. Representative 
 Ed Markey, U.S. Senator from Massachusetts
 Dodge Morgan  the first American to sail solo around the world with no stops;
 Mark Morrisroe performance artist and photographer
 Sam Nichols, Secretary of State of Washington
 Nerlens Noel, National Basketball Association player
 Helen Nordquist, All-American Girls Professional Baseball League player
 Edna May Oliver, actress
 Daniel W. Owens, playwright, author 
 Lawrence Palmer, Olympic gold medalist and ice hockey player
 Elliot Paul, author
 Marjorie Pierce, architect 
 David Robinson, drummer for The Cars and the Modern Lovers
 Richard Rodenheiser, Olympic gold medalist and ice hockey player
 Dana Rosenblatt, former professional boxer
 Dan Ross, former National Football League player
 William Schofield, federal judge
 Harriette Lucy Robinson Shattuck (1850–1937), author, writer on parliamentary law, suffragist
 Louise Kidder Sparrow, sculptor and poet
 Frank Stella, artist
 Louise Stokes, Olympic competitor and founder of the Colored Women's Bowling League
 Oliver Samuel Tonks, art historian
 John A. Volpe, former Governor of Massachusetts and U.S. Ambassador to Italy
 Michael Wigglesworth, preacher and author

References

External links

 
 Malden Public Library website
  History of Middlesex County, Volume II, p. 113 etc. (Medford, by W. H. Whitmore).  1880, published by Estes and Lauriat; edited by Samual Adams Drake.
 Births, Marriages and Deaths in the Town of Malden, 1649–1850 by Deloraine Pendre Corey, published 1903.

 
1640 establishments in Massachusetts
Cities in Massachusetts
Cities in Middlesex County, Massachusetts
Populated places established in 1640